Dame Ann Geraldine Limb  (born 13 February 1953) is a British educationalist, business leader, charity chair and philanthropist. In September 2015, she became the first woman Chair of The Scout Association since the organization was founded by Robert Baden Powell in 1907.

Early life and education 
Limb was born in Moss Side, Manchester, the daughter of a butcher, and studied at Marple Hall County Grammar School for Girls, now Marple Hall School, followed by the University of Liverpool. She is a Fellow Commoner of Lucy Cavendish College University of Cambridge.

Career

Career in further education 
From 1976 until 2001, Limb had a career in further education. In December 1987, aged 34, she was appointed Principal of Milton Keynes College, the youngest ever FE College Principal. After a decade, she moved to Cambridge Regional College, serving as Principal there until 2000. She then took up the post as Chief Executive University for Industry, Ufi.

Economic development and housing 
From 2005 to 2011, Limb was the Chair of the Milton Keynes Partnership and a Ministerial appointee to the Board of Homes England. From 2011 to 2019, Limb was chair of the country's top performing LEP, South East Midlands Local Enterprise Partnership (SEMLEP).

In November 2017, Limb was appointed as the independent business Chair of the UK Innovation Corridor.

Arts and culture 
Limb is Chair of IF: Milton Keynes International Festival, a multi-arts festival that engages people with music and sound in unusual spaces and places. The biennial festival, founded in 2010, runs for 10 days in July across central Milton Keynes.

Limb sits on the Council of Arts Council England South East Regional Council and led the bid for Milton Keynes to be European Capital of Culture in 2023.

Charity and philanthropic activity 
In 1998 Limb founded the Helena Kennedy Foundation, a social mobility charity supporting access to higher education. 
 
In July 2018, Limb made a major donation to Milton Keynes Gallery to enable the creation of the Limb Family Foyer in the newly extended gallery.

Limb is a member of the WorldSkills UK Skills taskforce for global Britain.

Other roles 
From 2016 to 2020 Limb served as chairman of the executive committee, and Deputy Chairman of her London club, the Athenaeum. She is also Vice Chair of the City & Guilds Group City and Guilds of London Institute.

Honours and awards 
Already Commander of the Order of the British Empire (CBE), Limb was appointed Dame Commander of the Order of the British Empire (DBE) in the 2022 Birthday Honours for services to young people and philanthropy.

Her academic honours include: Fellow Chartered Institution for Further Education, Fellow of the Royal Society of Arts FRSA, Fellow of the City and Guilds of London Institute (FCGI), Inaugural Fellow of Milton Keynes College, and Honorary Doctorates from Anglia Ruskin University, University of Bedfordshire, Open University, Manchester Metropolitan University, Sheffield Hallam University, and University of West London. She is a fellow-commoner of Lucy Cavendish College, Cambridge.

In 2019, Limb was named in the Northern Power Women 2019 Power List as an inspiring role model and agent of change, rooted in the North of England. In the same year she was also celebrated as #1 LGBTQ+ public sector role model on the 2019 "OUTstanding LGBT+ Role Model Lists", supported by Yahoo Finance and published annually by diversity charity INvolve.

Personal life 
Limb married her partner of 33 years Dr. Margaret Cook on 11 May 2019 and lives with her in Milton Keynes, Buckinghamshire.

References

External links

Patron of Educational Wealth Fund (2018)

1953 births
Living people
20th-century LGBT people
21st-century LGBT people
Alumni of the University of Liverpool
Dames Commander of the Order of the British Empire
Deputy Lieutenants of Buckinghamshire
Fellows of Lucy Cavendish College, Cambridge
People associated with Scouting
People from Moss Side
Philanthropists from Greater Manchester
The Scout Association